The Esoterrorists is a Contemporary Occult tabletop role-playing game, written by Robin D. Laws, and published by Pelgrane Press in 2006.

Description
The Esoterrorists is one of the games to use the GUMSHOE System. As elite investigators of the Ordo Veritatis, the characters combat occult terrorists who are intent on tearing the fabric of the world by exposing it to the creatures of the Outer Dark.

In The Esoterrorists setting, two players receive 32 investigative build points each, while five or more players receive 20 build points each. Any number of investigative build points can be spent on an investigative ability, though more than 3 or 4 points is rarely useful.

In The Esoterrorists setting players receive 60 general build points each. Any number of general build points can be spent on a general ability, as long as the second highest rated ability is at least half that of the highest rated. After a scenario is completed, player characters receive new build points that can be used as either investigative or general build points. The amount acquired depends on the length of the scenario. There are no levels through which player characters progress.

Publication history
Pelgrane Press kicked off their GUMSHOE system line with The Esoterrorists (2006), which was supported by the sourcebook The Esoterror Factbook (2006) by Robin Laws. A second edition was released in August 2013.

Reception
The Esoterrorists was nominated for both Best Game and Best Rules in the 2007 Ennie Awards.

Reviews
Pyramid

References

British role-playing games
Campaign settings
Contemporary role-playing games
Horror role-playing games
Pelgrane Press games
Robin Laws games
Role-playing games introduced in 2006